Marcelo Andrés Scatolaro Gunther (born 3 August 1985) is a Chilean-Argentine footballer who plays for Sportivo Italiano as a midfielder. Scatolaro prefers to play with right foot.

Personal life
Scatolaro holds dual Chilean-Argentine nationality since he was born in San Bernardo, Santiago de Chile, when his father, the former Argentine professional footballer Darío Scatolaro, played for Magallanes in Chile.

He is the owner of a gym called Savage Gym in Munro, Buenos Aires.

Titles

Honours
Platense
 Primera B Metropolitana (1): 2005–06

References

External links
 
  
 

1985 births
Living people
Footballers from Santiago
Chilean footballers
Chilean expatriate footballers
Chilean people of Argentine descent
Chilean people of Italian descent
Citizens of Argentina through descent
Argentine footballers
Club Atlético Platense footballers
Club Comunicaciones footballers
Club Atlético Atlanta footballers
San Martín de San Juan footballers
C.D. Huachipato footballers
Rangers de Talca footballers
Club Atlético Sarmiento footballers
Club Atlético Los Andes footballers
Club Almagro players
Sportivo Italiano footballers
Primera B Metropolitana players
Primera Nacional players
Chilean Primera División players
Argentine Primera División players
Primera C Metropolitana players
Chilean expatriate sportspeople in Argentina
Expatriate footballers in Argentina
Association football midfielders
People from Maipo Province